The Dehkhoda Lexicon Institute (meaning Dehkhoda Dictionary Institute) or International Center for Persian Studies: ICPS (مرکز بین‌المللی آموزش زبان فارسی) is the main official international center for teaching the Persian language and literature in Iran. It was founded in 1945 and is now part of the University of Tehran. It is named after Mirza Ali Akbar Ghazvini, known as Dehkhoda, a prominent Iranian literary scholar, poet, and author.

History
The institute traces its origins to a 1925 Iranian law decreeing the compilation of an official Persian dictionary. Work on the dictionary was begun by Dehkhoda, and upon his death, his residence was named The Dehkhoda Institute, and housed the academic staff from several Iranian universities who compiled the dictionary. In 1957, responsibility for the dictionary was delegated to Tehran University's Department of Persian Language and Literature, and The Dehkhoda Institute became part of the University of Tehran.  It is located in Valiasr Avenue near the Tajrish district of North Tehran. It is a part of Dr Mahmoud Afshar's foundation.

Current activities
The institute offers basic, intermediate and advanced courses in Persian for foreign and Iranian students, as well as higher level courses for graduates of Persian Language and Literature, Oriental Studies and Iranian Studies.

See also
Dehkhoda Dictionary

References

External links
 Dehkhoda Lexicon Institute and International Center for Persian Studies
 Dehkhoda Dictionary
 University of Tehran

Dehkhoda
Learned societies of Iran
University of Tehran
Persian language